Fisnik Rugova (born 26 August 1989) is a Kosovan professional basketball player for Bashkimi Prizren of the Kosovo Basketball Superleague. Rugova also plays in the Kosovo national team.

Professional career
In June 2016, Rugova signed a contract to return to Sigal Prishtina for a second stint. With Prishtina, he played in the FIBA Europe Cup during the 2016–17 season. He averaged 4 points per game over six group stage games.

National team career
Rugova represents the Kosovo national basketball team. With Kosovo, he played during the EuroBasket 2017 qualifiers.

References 

Living people
1989 births
Kosovan men's basketball players
KB Peja players
KB Prishtina players
Power forwards (basketball)